President Grant may refer to:

 Ulysses S. Grant (1822–1885), 18th President of the United States
 Presidency of Ulysses S. Grant, his presidency
 Fitzgerald Grant, fictional President of the United States in the TV series Scandal
 Mellie Grant, fictional President of the United States in the TV series Scandal

See also

 
 , several ships of the U.S. Navy
 Ulysses S. Grant (disambiguation)
 General Grant (disambiguation)
 President (disambiguation)
 Grant (disambiguation)